Maheshwar Singh is an Indian politician, who is currently the Member of Legislative Council from East Champaran as an Independent candidate. He is also the former Member of Bihar Legislative Assembly from Harsidhi, he won the 2005 Bihar Legislative Assembly election as a Lok Janshakti Party candidate.

After winning the MLC election he has promised to support anyone who speaks for the development of Champaran.

References 

Living people
Bihar MLAs 2005–2010
Members of the Bihar Legislative Council
Year of birth missing (living people)